Skyguard may refer to:
 Skyguard (area defense system)
 The Skyguard radar system used with Oerlikon 35 mm twin cannon
 Skyguard Ltd Lone Worker Protection